Paul-André Brasseur (born August 25, 1994) is a Canadian actor of partly Inuit ancestry.

When he starred in the 2008 film The Necessities of Life, he lived in Montreal and spoke French, so he learned his Inuktitut lines with the aid of co-star Natar Ungalaaq.

Filmography
 The Necessities of Life (Ce qu'il faut pour vivre) (2008)

References

External links
 

1994 births
Canadian male child actors
Canadian male film actors
Canadian male television actors
Inuit male actors
Living people
Male actors from Montreal
Canadian people of Inuit descent